Pipriac (Gallo: Pisperiac) is a commune in the Ille-et-Vilaine department in Brittany in northwestern France.

Population
Inhabitants of Pipriac are called Pipriatains in French.

International relations
Pipriac is  twinned with the village of Whitland in Carmarthenshire, Wales.

See also
Communes of the Ille-et-Vilaine department

References

External links

 Pipriac Info Website 
 Cultural Heritage 

Communes of Ille-et-Vilaine